The Bailey's treefrog (Dendropsophus werneri) is a species of frog in the family Hylidae.
It is endemic to southern Brazil.
Its natural habitats are subtropical or tropical seasonally wet or flooded lowland grassland, swamps, freshwater marshes, intermittent freshwater marshes, pastureland, and seasonally flooded agricultural land.

References

werneri
Endemic fauna of Brazil
Amphibians described in 1952
Taxonomy articles created by Polbot